The Catch Wrestling Association (CWA) was a professional wrestling organization based in Austria and Germany that was founded in 1973. It was run by Otto Wanz. The CWA featured a traditional brand of mat wrestling mixed with various “Strong Man” competitions. The company was engaged in talent-share agreements with other wrestling promotions, including New Japan Pro-Wrestling and the American Wrestling Association.  These agreements expanded the opportunities given to many European wrestlers. CWA's biggest card was the Euro Catch Festival, which was held twice a year (it was held in Graz, Austria in the summer, while in the winter, it was held in Bremen, Germany).

Matches were fought using European rules, including dividing matches into three-minute rounds and having the possibility of a victory by knockout. The CWA World Heavyweight Championship was recognized as the legitimate European World Championship as counterpart to the AWA, NWA and WWF titles in North America, the Universal Wrestling Association title in Mexico and NJPW's IWGP Heavyweight Championship in Japan.

Championships

Alumni

Chris Benoit
Ludvig Borga (Tony Halme)
Robbie Brookside (Robert Brooks)
Duke Droese/Marshall Duke (Mike Droese)
Dave "Fit" Finlay
Tatsumi Fujinami
John Hawk (John Layfield)
Ulf Herman (Ulf Nadrowski)
Barry Horowitz
Don Leo Jonathan (Don Heaton)
Marty Jones
Owen Hart
Texas Scott (Scott Hall)
Takayuki Iizuka
Fuji Yamaha (Michiyoshi Ohara)
Jean-Pierre Lafitte/Carl Wallace (Carl Ouellet)
Chris Jericho (Chris Irvine)
Joe E. Legend (Joe Hitchen)
Bob Orton Jr.
Baron von Raschke
Rhino Richards (Terry Gerin)
Road Warrior Hawk (Michael Hegstrand)
Paul Roma (Paul Centopani)
Lance Storm (Lance Evers)
Hiro Yamamoto (Hiroyoshi Yamamoto)
Bull Power (Leon White)
Otto Wanz
Ultimate Warrior (Warrior)
Papa Shango (Charles Wright)
Larry Cameron
Shinya Hashimoto
Giant Haystacks
Akira Nogami
Joe-Joe Lee (Satoshi Kojima)
Kendo Kashin (Tokimitsu Ishizawa)
Buffalo Peterson/Heavy Metal Buffalo/Maxx Payne (Darryl Peterson)
The Warlord (Terry Szopinski)
Rambo (Luc Poirier)
Mad Bull Buster (Anthony Durante)
Osamu Nishimura
Bonecrusher Dan Sileo
David Taylor
Cannonball Grizzly (Paul Neu)
Ice Train (Harold Hogue)
The Great Kokina (Rodney Anoa'i)
Jushin Thunder Liger (Keiichi Yamada)
Shaun Koen
Mile Zrno
Flyin' Scorpio/2 Cold Scorpio (Charles Scaggs)
Salvatore Bellomo
Drew McDonald
Bruiser Mastino (Mike Hallick)
Steve Regal (Darren Matthews)
Rip Rogers
Derrick Dukes
Moondog Rex
The Barbarian
Bastion Booger
Dan Collins
Tiger Mike (Mike Lozansky)
Mark Mercedes
Kendo Sasaki (Kensuke Sasaki)
Tony St. Clair
Franz Schumann
Sgt. Slaughter

See also
 List of professional wrestling promotions in Europe

References

External links
Catch Wrestling Association at Online World Of Wrestling
Catch Wrestling Association on Pro-Wrestling Title Histories

 
Entertainment companies established in 1973
German professional wrestling promotions
1973 establishments in Germany
Entertainment companies of Germany
Professional wrestling in Germany